The 1973 St. Petersburg Masters Invitation was a women's tennis tournament played on outdoor green clay courts at the St. Petersburg Tennis Center in St. Petersburg, Florida in the United States. The event was part of the USLTA circuit which in turn was part of the Grand Prix circuit. It was the third edition of the tournament and was held from April 16 through April 22, 1973. First-seeded Chris Evert won the singles title and earned $5,000 first-prize money.

Finals

Singles
 Chris Evert defeated  Evonne Goolagong 6–2, 0–6, 6–4
 It was Evert's 6th singles title of the year and the 17th of her career.

Doubles
 Chris Evert /  Jeanne Evert defeated  Evonne Goolagong /  Janet Young 6–2, 7–6

Prize money

References

St. Petersburg Masters Invitation
Eckerd Open
St. Petersburg Masters Invitation
St. Petersburg Masters Invitation
St. Petersburg Masters Invitation